The Paymaster-General of the United States Army was a general officer who was responsible for the Pay Department of the U.S. Army.

History
The office of the Paymaster General was created through a resolution of the Continental Congress on 16 June 1775, which established "That there be one Paymaster General, and a Deputy under him, for the Army, in a separate department; that the pay for the Paymaster General himself be one hundred dollars per month, and for the Deputy Paymaster under him, fifty dollars per month."

The position was abolished by consolidation of the Pay Department with the Quartermaster Department and the Subsistence Department to form the Quartermaster Corps under provisions of the army appropriation act for FY 1913 (37 Stat. 591), August 24, 1912.

Office Holders

References

 
1775 establishments in the Thirteen Colonies